Benjamin Leroy Holt (January 1, 1849 – December 5, 1920) was an American businessman and inventor who patented and manufactured the first practical crawler-type tread tractor. The continuous-type track is used for heavy agricultural and engineering vehicles to spread the weight over a large area to prevent the vehicle from sinking into soft ground. He founded with his brothers the Holt Manufacturing Company.

Early life

The youngest of four brothers and eleven siblings, the children of William Knox Holt and first, Eliza Jane Virgin, and later Harriet Parker Ames of Concord, New Hampshire. William Knox Holt owned a sawmill that made hardwood for wagon and coach construction. In 1864, Benjamin's brother Charles H. Holt arrived in San Francisco, California where he founded C. H. Holt and Co. The company produced wooden wheels for wagons and, later on, steel streetcar wheels. Brothers William Harrison Holt and Ames Frank Holt arrived in 1871. The company sold hardwood, lumber, wagon, and carriage materials, primarily manufacturing wagon axles, wheels, and frames. The brothers shipped hardwood from New Hampshire by ship to San Francisco.

In 1869, Benjamin went to work in his father's sawmill, readying hardwoods for shipping to his brothers in San Francisco. At age 23, he was given an interest in the business, and he managed shipping the lumber to the west coast. His mother died in 1875 and his father died eight years later in 1883. With his parents gone, Holt left for California as well.

Manufactured tractors

Benjamin Holt arrived in California in 1883. The Holt brothers formed the Stockton Wheel Company to season woods in a way that would prepare them for use in the arid valleys of California and deserts of the West. They based their new venture in the warm Central Valley town of Stockton, California, where the climate was suitable for drying wooden wheels. They invested $65,000 into a factory equipped with the best machinery available. By 1883 the brothers had 25 men on the payroll in a three-story brick building and a one-story wood-frame building in Stockton.

Benjamin was acknowledged by his family as an entrepreneurial and mechanical genius. Most of the surrounding fields were recovered from the delta of the San Joaquin River. Much of it was planted in wheat and Benjamin Holt produced his first horse-drawn "Link-Belt Combined Harvester." This machine used flexible chain belts rather than gears to transmit power from the ground wheels to the working mechanism, reducing breakage and down time. While manufacturing coach and wagon wheels and carriage bodies, Benjamin saw a need for mechanical Traction engines to replace horse-drawn machinery.

In 1890, Holt built his first experimental steam traction engine, nicknamed "Old Betsy". It developed  on a -long frame from a single -diameter, -stroke piston. It could burn wood, coal, or oil as fuel. Holt's tractors could harvest large fields for one-sixth the cost of a horse-drawn combine. Foresters soon adapted them to haul Redwood logs out of road-less forests.

Up to this time in America animal power was used to haul goods, so the tractor was a huge innovation. Benjamin Holt became president that year and the company was incorporated as the Holt Manufacturing Company.

One of his next innovations was to produce a side-hill harvester. He added two separate wooden frames which allowed the drive wheels to be raised or lowered independent of each other. This allowed the combine to operate on slopes as steep as 30 degrees while the threshing machine remained horizontally.

Benjamin's brother Ames Frank Holt died on October 7, 1889. In 1890, Benjamin married Anne Brown, daughter of Stockton pioneer Benjamin Eseck Brown and Lucy May Dean. Within five years, his two older brothers also died. William Harrison Holt died on February 15, 1904, and Charles Henry Holt died on July 8, 1905, leaving Benjamin in charge. Benjamin and Anne had five children: Alfred, William Knox, Anne, Edison Ames, and Benjamin Dean. William followed his father into the business as an adult.

While over 100 related patents for crawler-type tractor treads had already been issued worldwide, all failed to work in the field. The center of innovation was in England, and in 1903 Holt traveled to England to learn more about ongoing development, though all those he saw failed field tests. Benjamin returned to Stockton and utilizing his knowledge and his company metallurgical capabilities he became the first to design and manufacture a practical continuous tracks  for use in tractors.  On November 24, 1904, in the fields around Stockton, California, he successfully demonstrated the first successful track-type tractor.

Use during World War I
 
During World War I, Holt tractors were used to replace horses to haul artillery and other supplies. The Quartermaster Corps also used them to haul long trains of freight wagons over the unimproved dirt tracks behind the front. Holt tractors were also the inspiration for the development of the British and French tanks, which profoundly altered ground warfare tactics. 

By the end of the war, 10,000 Holt vehicles had been used in the Allied war effort.

On April 22, 1918, British Army officer Colonel Ernest Dunlop Swinton visited Stockton while on a tour of the US. Swinton publicly thanked Benjamin Holt and his workforce for their contribution to the war effort. During 1914 and 1915, Swinton had advocated basing some sort of armored fighting vehicle on Holt's caterpillar tractors, but without success. (Although Britain did develop tanks, they came from a separate source and were not directly influenced by Holt machines. After the appearance of tanks on the battlefield, Holt built a prototype, the Gas-electric tank, but it did not enter production.)

After the war ended, Holt focused less on agricultural machinery and more on producing road-building equipment. On December 5, 1920, 71-year-old Benjamin Holt died after a month-long illness. Five years later, the Holt Caterpillar Company merged with its strongest competitor, the C. L. Best company, to form what is now Caterpillar Inc., the 133rd largest company in the world as of 2008.

Legacy

A street in northern Stockton, California is named Benjamin Holt Drive in his honor. Benjamin Holt College Preparatory Academy, a middle and high school (grades 6–12), is named after him.

The Holt Memorial Hall, dedicated to his contributions to the mechanization of agriculture, opened at The Haggin Museum in Stockton, California in 1976. It includes the second oldest combine harvester on display in the United States (a 1904 Haines-Houser harvester) drawn by a circa-1918 Holt '75' Caterpillar track-type tractor. Both pieces are fully restored.

Benjamin Holt's wife Anna Brown Holt was a Regent of the University of the Pacific in Stockton for twenty five years. His great-grandson Peter Holt operates HOLT CAT of San Antonio, Texas, the United States' largest Caterpillar dealership and one of the largest dealerships in the world. He is best known as the owner of the five-time NBA champion San Antonio Spurs, the WNBA's San Antonio Stars, the AHL's San Antonio Rampage, and the NBA Development League's Austin Toros. Caterpillar Inc. as of 2008 was the 133rd largest company in the world with a market value of US$45.13 billion.

Holt is buried at Stockton Rural Cemetery in Stockton, California.

See also 
 Daniel Best
 Civil Engineering
 Bulldozer
 Warren Atherton
 G-numbers Army tractors
 Peter Holt
 Benjamin Holt House

References

External links

 Biography
 Invent Now Hall of Fame
 Traction Engine by B. Holt 

1849 births
1920 deaths
19th-century American inventors
20th-century American inventors
American manufacturing businesspeople
Businesspeople from California
Caterpillar Inc. people
Holt Manufacturing Company
People from Concord, New Hampshire
People from Stockton, California